The relationship between Ethiopia and the World Bank was formalized on December 27, 1945.

Ethiopia's first projects approved by the World Bank supported the building of infrastructure such as roads and highways during the 1950s. Ethiopia first sought a loan for "Highway Project (01)", which was approved on September 13, 1950. This loan had a total commitment value of $5 million. The goal of the project was to repair, rebuild, and construct new roads in Ethiopia after the Italian occupation from 1935 to 1941.

Ethiopia joined the International Finance Corporation (IFC) on July 20, 1956 and the International Development Association (IDA) on April 11, 1961.

Ethiopia joined the Multilateral Investment Guarantee Agency (MIGA) on August 13, 1991. However, Ethiopia did not join the International Centre for Settlement of Investment Disputes (ICSID).

As Ethiopia is one of the poorest countries in Africa, in 2005 Ethiopia received a 100% loan debt relief from the World Bank, International Monetary Fund, and the African Development Bank.

In May 2022, the World bank has grant $300 million to assist in the recovery and reconstruction of conflict-hit areas in Ethiopia.

Voting powers in the World Bank Group 
International Bank for Reconstruction and Development (IBRD)
 Total Subscriptions - Amount 147.0 / Percent of Total 0.06
 Voting Power - No. of Votes 2,201 / Percent of Total 0.09

International Finance Corporation (IFC)
 Total Subscriptions - Amount 127 / Percent of Total 0.00
 Voting Power - No. of Votes 942 / Percent of Total 0.03

International Development Association (IDA) Part II Countries
 Voting Power - No. of Votes 49,232 / Percent of Total 0.17

Multilateral Investment Guarantee Agency (MIGA) Part II Countries
 Total Subscriptions - Amount 1.23 / Percent of Total 0.07
 Voting Power - No. of Votes 349 / Percent of Total 0.16

Projects
Ethiopia has received approval for large projects, including:

 One WASH - Consolidated water Supply, Sanitation, and Hygiene Account Project (One WASH - CWA) 
 Ethiopia Climate Action Through Landscape Management Program For Results
 Renewable Energy Guarantees program
 Lowlands Livelihood Resilience Project
 Ethiopia Growth and Competitiveness

References 

World Bank Group relations
Economy of Ethiopia